Matei Airport , also known as Taveuni Airport or Taveuni Island Airport, is an airport located in Matei on the northern end of Taveuni, an island of the Vanua Levu Group in Fiji. It is operated by Airports Fiji Limited.

The airport is quite small but receives a number of flights from Fiji Link from Nadi and Suva. The airport is quite close to a number of resorts and small accommodation providers. The airport also has recently been upgraded from a gravel runway to a paved runway.

Facilities

Airlines and destinations

References

External links

 

Airports in Fiji
Vanua Levu